Akuji the Heartless is an action-adventure video game developed by Crystal Dynamics and published by Eidos Interactive. It was released for the PlayStation on December 31, 1998, in North America and February 1999 in Europe. The game received mixed reviews upon its release.

Gameplay
Akurji the Heartless is a free-roaming 3D action game.

Plot
The game centres on the voodoo priest and warrior Akuji (voiced by Richard Roundtree), who had his heart ripped out on his wedding day, and through the use of voodoo magic is now cursed to wander the Underworld.

However, Kesho (voiced by Jamesetta Bunn), his would-be bride, finds him in hell and speaks to him in soul form: she informs him that it was Orad, Akuji's own brother, who orchestrated his murder.

She begs Akuji to escape and stop him, as their families are preparing for war, and Orad is preparing to sacrifice her to the gods.

Upon traveling through the first level of the Underworld and consulting loa Baron Samedi (voiced by Petri Hawkins-Byrd) Akuji discovers he has a chance for redemption: if he traverses hell and collects the souls of his ancestors, which the Baron despises for their evil, then he will grant Akuji safe passage out of the underworld.

On his way through, he must also defeat the wardens of each of the vestibules of hell, which will enable him to advance on his quest for the souls.

Eventually, after Akuji retrieves the Seal of Sadiki, the Baron steals it from him and reveals he'd tricked Akuji into collecting the souls of his ancestors so it would allow him to break free of his own imprisonment in the Underworld and exact his revenge on the mortal world while also making Kesho his servant once he sacrifices her. Kesho further confirms that the Baron had orchestrated Akuji's murder by possessing Orad and had also earlier used her voice to lead Akuji to him. Akuji engages the Baron in one last battle and succeeds, rescuing Kesho who in turn restores Akuji's heart, sending them back to the mortal world.

Development
Akuji the Heartless was built on the Gex: Enter the Gecko game engine.

Reception

Next Generation reviewed the PlayStation version of the game, rating it three stars out of five, and stated that "Crystal Dynamics has certainly provided gamers with a solid action title with enough imagination to please those who possess a penchant for the macabre. Yet the rough controls and animations keep Akuji from truly stepping into the genre's limelight."

The game received mixed reviews according to the review aggregation website GameRankings.

Notes

References

External links

1998 video games
Action-adventure games
Crystal Dynamics games
Eidos Interactive games
Square Enix franchises
PlayStation (console) games
PlayStation (console)-only games
Video games developed in the United States
Video games featuring black protagonists
Single-player video games
Fiction about Voodoo